The Lionhearts is an American animated television series from MGM that aired on Saturday and Sunday mornings in syndication from September 19 to December 12, 1998. The series aired on syndication in the United States and was also seen in Australia and Latin America (translated into Spanish as Los Corazón de León). The show was last seen on Teletoon in Canada in the early 2000s. The Lionhearts was one of the last series produced by Claster Television Incorporated and Metro-Goldwyn-Mayer Animation.

Plot
The Lionhearts focuses on the behind the scenes life of MGM's mascot, Leo Lionheart, and his family. The series shows The Lionhearts living in a normal house and living a normal life just like non-celebrity families. Most of the members of the family are named after famous MGM movie stars. The characters first appeared on a series of Sing-Along children's videos released by MGM in 1997. The original character designs (especially those of Spencer and Kate) were greatly modified for the TV series. Ashley Tisdale provided the voice of Kate in the Sing-Along videos, while Charles Rocket was the voice of Leo, Lana was voiced by Debra Jo Rupp and Chris Marquette did the voice of Spencer .

Characters

Lionheart Family
Leo Lionheart Jr. (voiced by: William H. Macy in the TV series, Charles Rocket in the "MGM Sing-Along" videos): Leo is the father, husband and provider of the family. He works as the mascot for MGM's movies, a role which was passed onto him by father Leo Sr. One of Leo's favorite things to do when gets the chance is to nap. In the "MGM Sing-Alongs" videos, he was typically naked, but sometimes wore a grey shirt, a black trenchcoat and hat when going to or leaving work.
Lana Lionheart (voiced by: Peri Gilpin in the TV series, Debra Jo Rupp in the "MGM Sing-Along" videos): Lana is the mother and wife of the family, she is also the glue that keeps the family from falling apart. She used to work as an acrobat in the circus. She was named after Lana Turner. In the "MGM Sing-Alongs" videos, she wore a purple dress that varied between long-sleeved, short-sleeved and sleeveless.
Kate Lionheart (voiced by: Natasha Slayton in the TV Series, Ashley Tisdale in the "MGM Sing-Along" videos): Kate is the oldest of the three children Leo and Lana have, she's 10 years old. She likes to e-mail, talk to her friends, ride horses and go to school. Kate is very tolerant of her siblings, and a very polite girl overall. Kate is named after Katharine Hepburn. In the "MGM Sing-Alongs" videos, she was much younger, had glasses and short hair, wore a blue dress with white polka dots and was barefoot.
Spencer Lionheart (voiced by: Cameron Finley in the TV series, Chris Marquette in the "MGM Sing-Along" videos): Spencer is the middle of the three children, he's 8 years old. His dreams are to one day be a big-time rock n' roll star. One of his major flaws at times is he doesn't finish what he starts. He takes his name from Spencer Tracy. In the "MGM Sing-Alongs", he was much younger, had shirtless, wore red shorts and his shoes were green and white.
Judy Lionheart (voiced by: Nicolette Little in the TV series, Kylie Erica Mar in the "MGM Sing-Along" videos): Judy is the youngest of the children, she's 5 years old. She is very curious and loves to play. She also looks up to her sister Kate as her heroine. Judy is named after Judy Garland. In the "MGM Sing-Alongs" videos, she was more of a toddler and wore a pink shirt.
Leo Lionheart Sr. (voiced by Harve Presnell): The grandfather of Kate, Spencer, and Judy who is also Leo Lionheart's father. He has relations to the titular characters of the Tom and Jerry series.

Other characters
Director (voiced by Joe Pantoliano): A director who works with Leo at MGM Studios.
Dorothy (voiced by Betty White): Leo's makeup artist who can't see very well.
Freddy (voiced by Wallace Shawn): Leo's talent agent.
Hank (voiced by Jeffrey Tambor): MGM's president.
Jennings (voiced by Michael Jackson): Grandpa Leo's chauffeur who drives the limo.

Guest stars included Tom Kenny, Carlos Alazraqui, Justin Shenkarow, Edie McClurg, Clancy Brown, Tom Arnold, Karl Malden, Ben Stein, Craig Ferguson and Kathy Ireland.

Production
The series was announced in 1997, the brainchild of John Symes, then president of MGM Worldwide TV Group. MGM Animation signed actors William H. Macy, Peri Gilpin, Jeffrey Tambor and Betty White, among others, to provide voices producing 13 half-hour episodes of “The Lionhearts,” set for a September 1998 bow in syndication. MGM Animation tapped sitcom scribe Ruth Bennett as exec producer and head writer for the series.

Episodes

References

External links
MGM's Official site for The Lionhearts

Entry on the Big Cartoon Database

1998 American television series debuts
1998 American television series endings
1990s American animated television series
American children's animated comedy television series
Animated television series about children
Animated television series about families
Animated television series about lions
English-language television shows
First-run syndicated television programs in the United States
Television series by MGM Television
Television series by Claster Television
Television series by Metro-Goldwyn-Mayer Animation